Hermann II (born 1049; died Dalhem, 20 September 1085), Count Palatine of Lotharingia 1064–1085. He was count in the Ruhrgau and the Zulpichgau, as well as a count of Brabant.

Life
According to Egon Kimpen he was the son of Henry I of Lotharingia († 1061) and Mathild of Verdun († 1060), daughter of Gozelo I of Lotharingia, but the basis for this has been questioned. However, if that is the case, his maternal uncle was Pope Stephen IX. Until 1064, young Hermann was under the guardianship of Anno II, Archbishop of Cologne, who significantly reduced Hermann's territorial power.

In 1080 he married Adelaide of Weimar-Orlamünde († 1100), widow of Adalbert II, Count of Ballenstedt. She was a daughter of Otto of Orlamünde, count of Weimar and margrave of Meissen in Thuringia, and Adela of Brabant. Together they had two children who had died by 1085.

He is assumed to have been the last Count Palatine of Lotharingia of the Ezzonian dynasty. He was killed in a duel with Albert III, Count of Namur, near his castle in Dalhem. 

His widow married again, her third husband being Henry of Laach, count in the Mayfeldgau, who became the first count palatine of the Rhine between 1085 and 1087.

References

Sources

Further reading
Van Droogenbroeck F.J., 'De betekenis van paltsgraaf Herman II (1064-1085) voor het graafschap Brabant', Eigen Schoon en De Brabander 87 (2004), 1-166.
Van Droogenbroeck F.J., Het landgraafschap Brabant (1085-1183) en zijn paltsgrafelijke voorgeschiedenis. De territoriale en institutionele aanloop tot het ontstaan van het hertogdom Brabant (2004)

Counts Palatine of Lotharingia
1049 births

1085 deaths